Lenny Daws (born 29 December 1978) is a British professional boxer. He held the British super lightweight title twice between 2006 and 2011, and the EBU European Union super lightweight title between 2012 and 2014.

Boxing career

Early professional career
Daws made his professional debut on 16 April 2003, defeating Danny Gwilym at the Ice Arena in Nottingham. Over next few years he compiled a record of twelve consecutive victories with wins over the likes of Ernie Smith, Karl Taylor and Oscar Hall. On 12 May 2006, he defeated Colin Lynes at the York Hall in Bethnal Green to win the Southern Area light welterweight title. The fight also served as an eliminator for the full British title.

British champion
Daws fought for the British belt on 12 May 2006, in his very next fight. The contest, once again held at the York Hall, saw Daws defeat Northumbrian boxer Nigel Wright via a 12 round points decision. The new champions reign was however to be short lived with the first defence of the title also resulting in a first defeat. Daws lost the belt to Scotsman, Barry Morrison at the Alexandra Palace in Wood Green, this time by split decision with one judge scoring widely in Daws favour with the other two scoring narrowly to Morrison.

Road back to contention
Following the Morrison defeat, Daws returned to action in May 2007 with a win over Billy Smith and then challenged former opponent Nigel Wright for Wright's English title on 14 November 2007. The contest with Wright again took place at the York Hall and resulted in a draw meaning that Wright retained the belt. He went on to win three more fights before getting another chance to fight for the English title. His chance came on 11 April 2009, and claimed the belt with a win over Peter McDonagh the Southern Area champion. The win gave Daws the opportunity to challenge Ajose Olusegun for his old British title, before Olusegun vacated the belt choosing to fight in an eliminator for the WBC light welterweight instead. This meant that Daws opponent in the other corner for the vacant belt would now be old foe Barry Morrison in a contest to take place on 18 September 2009. The fight itself, at the York Hall once more, saw Daws regain the belt he lost to Morrison and gain revenge over the only man to have beaten him with a 10th round stoppage.

Two time British Champion
The win over Morrison propelled Daws back to the top of the domestic scene as holder of the British light welterweight title.  His first defence was against Welshman Jason Cook on 2 February 2010.  Cook, a former European lightweight champion, had taken some time away from the sport only to bounce back and reach the semi-final of the Prizefighter light welterweight tournament.  Despite being rocked in the first round Daws did enough to retain the title via a draw with all three judges scoring closely.  Daws next defence was held on 9 July 2010 against English champion Steve Williams, Daws retained for the second time after Williams sustained two cuts on his eye which forced his corner to pull him out.  On 19 February 2011, in his third defence of the title, Daws lost the belt to Ashley Theophane at the Wembley Arena.  Despite taking control in the first half of the fight, Theophane came on strong in the second half and knocked Daws down twice in the 9th round to run out an eventual winner over 12 rounds.

References

1978 births
Living people
People from Morden
People from Carshalton
English male boxers
Boxers from Greater London
Light-welterweight boxers